The 2023 Nicholls Colonels football team will represent Nicholls State University as a member of the Southland Conference during the 2023 NCAA Division I FCS football season. The Colonels are led by ninth-year head coach Tim Rebowe and will play their home games at Manning Field at John L. Guidry Stadium in Thibodaux, Louisiana.

Schedule

References

Nicholls Colonels
Nicholls Colonels football seasons
Nicholls Colonels